Browns Sing the Big Ones from Country is an album by American Country music group, the Browns, released in 1967 on the RCA Camden label. The trio took on a number of country hits at a time when listeners often preferred to hear the latest songs by their  favorite singers and groups.

Track listing 
"Where Does the Good Times Go" (Buck Owens)
"All of Me Belongs to You" (Merle Haggard)	 
"Ride Ride Ride" (Liz Anderson)
"Once" (Ted Harris)
"Happy Tracks" (Ray Pennington)
"Walk Through This World With Me" (Sandy Seamons, Kaye Savage)
"Country Boy's Dream" (Ernie Newton)
"If the Whole World Stopped Lovin'" (Ben Peters)
"I'm a Lonesome Fugitive" (Liz Anderson, Casey Anderson)
"Misty Blue" (Bob Montgomery)

Personnel
Jim Ed Brown – vocals
Maxine Brown – vocals
Bonnie Brown – vocals
Jerry Reed – guitar
Wayne Moss – guitar
Chip Young – guitar
Ray Edenton – guitar
 Weldon Myrick  – pedal steel guitar
Roy Huskey – bass
Jerry Carrigan – drums
David Briggs – piano

The Browns albums
1967 albums
Albums produced by Chet Atkins
RCA Camden albums